Gilia austrooccidentalis is a species of flowering plant in the phlox family known by the common name southwestern gilia. The scientific name is sometimes spelt Gilia austro-occidentalis. It is endemic to the Central Coast Ranges of California, where it grows in local hill and valley habitat.

Description
It is a slender herb producing a very glandular stem sometimes laced with cobwebby fibers. The lobed leaves are located in a rosette around the base of the stem. The inflorescence is a cluster of flowers dotted with glands and webby hairs. The sepals are green to purple and ribbed with membrane between the ribs. The corolla is purple with a yellowish throat.

Taxonomy
The species was first described in 1956 as Gilia inconspicua subsp. austrooccidentalis. It was raised to a full species in 1960. In both cases, the authors spelt the epithet without a hyphen, as does the International Plant Names Index. The Jepson eFlora spells the name with a hyphen.

References

External links
USDA Plants Profile
Gilia austro-occidentalis - Photo gallery

austrooccidentalis
Endemic flora of California
Natural history of the California Coast Ranges
Plants described in 1956